Wild Horse Canyon is a 1938 American Western film directed by Robert F. Hill and written by Robert Emmett Tansey. The film stars Jack Randall, Dorothy Short, Frank Yaconelli, Warner Richmond, Walter Long and Dennis Moore. The film was released on December 21, 1938, by Monogram Pictures.

Plot

Cast          
Jack Randall as Jack Gray 
Dorothy Short as Jean Hall
Frank Yaconelli as Lopez Valdesto
Warner Richmond as Travers
Walter Long as Roscoe
Dennis Moore as Pete Hall
Charles King as Red 
Ed Cassidy as Tom Hall
Earl Douglas as Valdesto
Hal Price as Sheriff

References

External links
 

1938 films
1930s English-language films
American Western (genre) films
1938 Western (genre) films
Monogram Pictures films
Films directed by Robert F. Hill
American black-and-white films
1930s American films